The Babuna River (in ) in North Macedonia is a right tributary of the Vardar. It collects water from sink holes on Begovo Pole and flows from the southern flank of the Jakupica range. It is alimented by the Kamen Lednik glacier through the Bogomila Falls, just north of Nezhilovo village.

References

Rivers of North Macedonia
Tributaries of the Vardar
Čaška Municipality